Santhanuthalapadu Assembly constituency is a scheduled caste reserved constituency in Bapatla district of Andhra Pradesh, representing the state legislative assembly in India. As per the Delimitation Orders (2008), the constituency covers Santhanuthalapadu, Maddipadu, Naguluppalapadu and Chimakurthi mandals. It is one of the seven assembly segments of Bapatla (SC) (Lok Sabha constituency), along with Vemuru Repalle, Bapatla, Parchur, Addanki, Chirala and Santhanuthalapadu.

Mandals

Members of Legislative Assembly

Election results

Assembly elections 2019

Assembly elections 2014

Assembly Elections 2009

Assembly Elections 2004

Assembly elections 1999

Assembly elections 1994

Assembly elections 1989

Assembly elections 1985

Assembly elections 1983

Assembly elections 1978

Assembly elections 1972

Assembly elections 1967

Assembly elections 1962

See also
 List of constituencies of Andhra Pradesh Legislative Assembly

References

Assembly constituencies of Andhra Pradesh